Patricia Castañeda can refer to:
Patricia Castañeda (b. 1977), Colombian actress
Patricia Castañeda Miyamoto (b. 1990), Mexican swimmer
Nancy Patricia Gutiérrez Castañeda (b. 1963), Colombian Senator